Summer Erb (born July 25, 1977) is an American basketball player. She played for Charlotte Sting in 2002 as center. She is 198 cm tall and 109 kg weight. She also played for Bursa Yıldırım and Fenerbahçe İstanbul in Turkey.

She was born in Lakewood, Ohio. After spending her freshman season (1996) playing for the Purdue University Lady Boilers, she transferred to North Carolina State University to complete her college eligibility.

Purdue and NC State statistics
Source

Source

USA Basketball

Erb was named to the team representing the US at the 1998 William Jones Cup competition in Taipei, Taiwan. The USA team won all five games, earning the gold medal for the competition. Erb scored 23 points over the five games.

References

External links
 WNBA Profil
 Yahoo Profil

1977 births
Living people
American expatriate basketball people in Turkey
American women's basketball players
Basketball players from Ohio
Charlotte Sting players
Fenerbahçe women's basketball players
NC State Wolfpack women's basketball players
Purdue Boilermakers women's basketball players
Sportspeople from Lakewood, Ohio